The 1938 Banda Sea earthquake occurred on February 2 with an estimated magnitude of 8.5–8.6 on the moment magnitude scale and a Rossi–Forel intensity of VII (Very strong tremor). This oblique-slip event generated destructive tsunamis of up to 1.5 metres in the Banda Sea region, but there were no deaths.

Tectonic setting
The Banda Sea is located within a very complex tectonic regime that accommodates the convergence between the Australian Plate and the Sunda Plate. The Molucca Sea Plate, Bird's Head Plate, Timor Plate, and Banda Sea Plate all help accommodate the elaborate plate boundary system in the region. This collection of microplates leads to large amounts of seismicity in the area, including the 1852 Banda Sea earthquake which was potentially a  8.8 event, as well as the 1629 Banda Sea earthquake which was also estimated at up to  8.8.

Earthquake
At around 04:00 local time, a large earthquake started to shake the Banda islands. With a moment magnitude of 8.5–8.6, the earthquake caused a destructive tsunami of 1 meter at the Kai islands. The tsunami expected for an earthquake of this size is much greater, such as of those in 1629 and 1852, however this earthquake occurred at a depth of 60km which impeded much of the ocean floor displacement which leads to a tsunami. This earthquake is of significant scientific interest as it remains a mystery as to precisely which fault produced this earthquake. Some studies consider this earthquake the largest intraslab earthquake we know of.

Tsunami
Despite being a large thrust faulting event, the tsunami was rather small. This is assumed to be caused by the 60 kilometer depth. At the Kai islands, runups of 1 meter were recorded. Beachfront damage was reported across the Tayandu Islands and the entire Banda region.

See also
List of earthquakes in 1938
List of earthquakes in Indonesia
1852 Banda Sea earthquake

References

External links

Megathrust earthquakes in Indonesia
1938 in the Dutch East Indies
Banda Sea Earthquake, 1938
Banda Sea
February 1938 events
1938 disasters in Asia 
1938 disasters in Oceania 
20th-century disasters in Indonesia